Hinsdale County is a county located in the U.S. state of Colorado. As of the 2020 census, the population was 788, making it the second-least populous county in Colorado. With a population density of only , it is also the least-densely populated county in Colorado. The county seat and only incorporated municipality in the county is Lake City. The county is named for George A. Hinsdale, a prominent pioneer and former Lieut. Governor of Colorado Territory.

Geography

Hinsdale County is one of the most remote counties in Colorado and the United States. The county is covered by mountains, including multiple fourteeners, and contains one of the largest roadless areas in the country. The continental divide crosses the county twice. Most of the county is divided among several different national forests and the Weminuche Wilderness area.

Adjacent counties
Gunnison – north
Saguache – northeast
Mineral – east
Archuleta – southeast
La Plata – southwest
San Juan – west
Ouray – northwest

Major Highways
  State Highway 149

Demographics

As of the census of 2000, there were 790 people, 359 households, and 246 families living in the county. The population density was 0.7 people per square mile (0.3/km2). There were 1,304 housing units at an average density of 1.2 per square mile (0.5/km2). The racial makeup of the county was 97.34% White, 1.52% Native American, 0.25% Asian, 0.38% from other races, and 0.51% from two or more races. 1.52% of the population were Hispanic or Latino of any race.

There were 359 households, out of which 23.4% had children under the age of 18 living with them, 61.0% were married couples living together, 4.7% had a female householder with no husband present, and 31.20% were non-families. 24.8% of all households were made up of individuals, and 3.1% had someone living alone who was 65 years of age or older. The average household size was 2.2 and the average family size was 2.6.

In the county, the population was spread out, with 19.5% under the age of 18, 4.7% from 18 to 24, 29.5% from 25 to 44, 34.7% from 45 to 64, and 11.6% who were 65 years of age or older. The median age was 44 years. For every 100 females there were 105.7 males. For every 100 females age 18 and over, there were 109.9 males.

The median income for a household in the county was $37,279, and the median income for a family was $42,159. Males had a median income of $26,210 versus $23,750 for females. The per capita income for the county was $22,360. About 4.5% of families and 7.2% of the population were below the poverty line, including none of those under age 18 and 2.2% of those age 65 or over.

Politics
Republican presidential nominees have carried Hinsdale County since Franklin Delano Roosevelt defeated Alf Landon by eight votes in 1936. Along with Elbert County and Washington County it was one of three Colorado counties to vote for Barry Goldwater over Lyndon Johnson in 1964. In 2020, Joe Biden received the highest vote share for a Democrat since Johnson, and became the third Democrat since 1940 to breach 40% of the vote.

The last Democrat to carry Hinsdale County in a statewide election was John Hickenlooper in the 2010 gubernatorial contest, and the only other case since at least 1980 have been Democratic senator Ben “Nighthorse” Campbell, who was later to shift to the Republican Party, in 1992, alongside popular Governor Roy Romer, who carried all but three counties statewide, in 1990.

Recreation

National forests
Gunnison National Forest
Rio Grande National Forest
San Juan National Forest
Uncompahgre National Forest

National wilderness areas
La Garita Wilderness
Powderhorn Wilderness
Uncompahgre Wilderness
Weminuche Wilderness

Trails
Colorado Trail
Continental Divide National Scenic Trail
West Lost Trail Creek National Recreation Trail

Scenic byways
Alpine Loop National Scenic Back Country Byway
Silver Thread Scenic Byway

Communities

Town
Lake City

Census-designated places
Cathedral
Piedra

Ghost towns
Beartown
Burrows Park
Capitol City
Carson
Henson
Old Carson

Education
School districts include:
 Hinsdale County School District RE-1
 Archuleta County School District 50-JT

See also

Outline of Colorado
Index of Colorado-related articles
Colorado census statistical areas
National Register of Historic Places listings in Hinsdale County, Colorado

References

External links

Official Tourism website for Lake City Hinsdale County Marketing Committee and Chamber of Commerce
 Hinsdale County and Lake City Museum
 Lake City Downtown Improvement and Revitalization Team (Official Main Street Program)
 Lake City Area Medical Center
Colorado County Evolution by Don Stanwyck
Colorado Historical Society

 
Colorado counties
1874 establishments in Colorado Territory
Populated places established in 1874